This is a list of the abunas of Ethiopia, the spiritual heads of the Ethiopian Orthodox Tewahedo Church. The Abuna is known officially as Patriarch and Catholicos of Ethiopia, Archbishop of Axum and Ichege of the See of Saint Taklehaimanot. Mathias acceded to this position on 28 February 2013.

The Ethiopian Orthodox Tewahedo Church is part of the Oriental Orthodox communion, and it was granted autocephaly by Cyril VI, Pope of the Coptic Orthodox Church, in 1959.

Bishops of Axum
 Abune Selama I Kesatay Birhan (St. Frumentius) ( 305 – mid 4th century)
 Minas or Elyas
 Abreham (late 4th century – early 5th century)
 Petros
 Abba Afse (late 5th century – early 6th century)
 Qozmos ( early 6th century)
 Euprepius ( early 6th century)
 vacant ( 537–562)

Metropolitan Archbishops of Axum and of All Ethiopia
 Qerellos (620s – mid 7th century)
 unknown
 Yohannes ( 820–840)
 Yaqob I ( mid 9th century)
 Salama Za-'Azeb ( 9th century)
 Bartalomewos ( 10th century)
 Peter (920s), opposed by Minas and Fiqtor
 vacant ( 940–970s)
 Daniel ( late 10th century)
 Fiqtor ( 11th century)
 'Abdun, claimant
 Sawiros (1077–1092)
 Giyorgis I ( 1090s)
 Mikael I ( early–mid 12th century)
 Yaqob II
 Gabra Krestos
 Atnatewos ( late 12th century)
 Mikael II (1206–1209), opposed by Hirun
 Yeshaq ( 1209–1225)
 Giyorgis II ( 1225)
 Saint Tekle Haymanot ( 13th century), according to tradition
 Yohannes (XIII?) ( 14th century)
 Yaqob (III?) ( 1337–1344)
 vacant (1344–1348)
 Salama II (1348–1388)
 vacant (1388-1398/9)
 Bartalomewos (1398/9–1436)
 Mikael and Gabriel (1438–1458)
 vacant (1458–1481)
 Yeshaq (1481–  1520)
 Marqos (VI?) (1481–  1530)
 João Bermudes ( 1536– 1545), self-proclaimed Ethiopian Orthodox Abuna, and Catholic Patriarch of Ethiopia and Alexandria
 Endyras ( 1545–?)
 Andrés de Oviedo (1557–1577), Catholic bishop
 Marqos (VII?) ( 1565)
 Krestodolos I ( 1590)
 Petros (VI?) (1599?–1607), killed in battle
 Simon (1608–1617), died 1624
 Afonso Mendes (1622–1632), Catholic Patriarch, supported by Susenyos I and deposed by Fasilides
 vacant (1632–1633)
 Rezek ( 1634)
 Marqos (VIII?) ( 1635–1672), deposed with Krestodolos
 Krestodolos II ( 1640–1672), deposed with Marqos
 Sinoda (1672–1687)
 vacant (1687–1689)
 Marqos (IX ?) (1689–late 17th century)
 Abba Mikael (1640–1699)
 Marqos X (1694–1716)
 vacant (1716–1718)
 Krestodolos III ( 1718–1745)
 vacant (1745– 1747)
 Yohannes XIV ( 1747–1770)
 Yosab III (1770–1803)
 vacant (1803– 1808)
 Makarios (  1808)
 vacant ( 1808–1816)
 Qerellos III (1816–1829)
 vacant (1829–1841)
 Salama III (1841–1867)
 vacant (1867–1868)
 Atnatewos II (1868–1876), died of wounds received at the Battle of Gura
 Petros VII (1876–1889), died 1918
 Mattheos X (1889–1926)
 Qerellos IV (1926–1936), deposed following the Second Italo-Ethiopian War
 Abraham (1937–1939), installed during the Italian occupation
 Yohannes XV (1939–1945), installed during the Italian occupation
 Qerellos IV (1945–1950), restored
 Basilios (1951–1959)

On 13 July 1948, the Coptic Orthodox and Ethiopian churches reached an agreement that led to the elevation of the Ethiopian Orthodox Tewahedo Church to the rank of an Autonomous Church; allowing the Archbishop of All Ethiopia to consecrate on his own bishops and metropolitans for the Ethiopian Church and to form a local Holy Synod. The Archbishop, however, is consecrated by the Pope of Alexandria along with the members of the Holy Synod of the Ethiopian Orthodox Tewahedo Church.

Patriarchs and Catholicoi of All Ethiopia

In 1959, the Coptic Orthodox Church granted autocephaly to the Ethiopian Orthodox Tewahedo Church, and elevated the Archbishop to the Patriarchal dignity and was enthroned with the title of: Patriarch and Re'ese Liqane Papasat Echege (Catholicos) of the Ethiopian Orthodox Tewahedo Church. The title of Ichege (Supreme Abbot) of the See of St. Tekle Haymanot of Debre Libanos was subsumed into the Patriarchate. The title of Ichege was revived and the title of Archbishop of Axum was added to the Patriarchal titles in 2005, as Axum was the seat of Ethiopia's first Bishop, St. Frumentius, and thus the oldest see in the church.

Timeline

Gallery

See also
 Coptic Christianity
 Eritrean Orthodox Tewahedo Church
 List of abunas of Eritrea
 Ethiopian ecclesiastical titles

References

Sources
 Modern Primates of Ethiopia (1694–present)

Lists of Ethiopian people
 
Archbishops of Ethiopia
 
Ethiopia
Ethiopia